The sixth season of the American comedy-drama television series Orange Is the New Black premiered on Netflix on July 27, 2018, at 12:00 am PDT in multiple countries. It consists of thirteen episodes, each between 50 and 84 minutes. The series is based on Piper Kerman's memoir, Orange Is the New Black: My Year in a Women's Prison (2010), about her experiences at FCI Danbury, a minimum-security federal prison. The series is created and adapted for television by Jenji Kohan.

This season takes place in a maximum security prison, after the inmates incite a riot at Litchfield Penitentiary during the previous season, and the season deals with the fallout from the riot. The main story arc of the season involves a gang-like war between two cell blocks which is sparked by the feud between two sisters. Meanwhile, the guards play a fantasy sport game called "fantasy inmate". Several supporting characters who appeared throughout the first five seasons are absent in this season due to change in setting, but this season introduces several new characters featured in maximum security.

Episodes

Cast and characters

Main cast

Guest stars
 Michael J. Harney as Sam Healy
 Lea DeLaria as Carrie "Big Boo" Black
 Alex Trebek as himself
 Rosal Colon as Carmen "Ouija" Aziza
 Francesca Curran as Helen "Skinhead Helen" Van Maele
 Willie Casper Perry as Slide Orderly

Recurring cast

Inmates

Production
In February 2016, Netflix gave the series a three-season renewal, which included its sixth season. For the sixth season, Laura Gómez, Matt Peters and Dale Soules were promoted to series regulars.

Reception

Critical response
The sixth season received positive reviews from critics, with most critics noting its improvement over the previous season. On Metacritic, it has a score of 69 out of 100 based on 14 reviews. On Rotten Tomatoes, it has an 83% rating with an average score of 7.3 out of 10 based on 35 reviews. The site's critical consensus reads: "Brutality and humor continue to mesh effectively in a season of Orange Is the New Black that stands as a marked improvement from its predecessor, even if some arcs are more inspired than others."

Accolades
For the 71st Primetime Emmy Awards, Laverne Cox received a nomination for Outstanding Guest Actress in a Drama Series.

References

External links
 
 

Orange Is the New Black
2018 American television seasons